Take Care, Take Care, Take Care is the sixth studio album by American post-rock band Explosions in the Sky, which was released on April 18, 2011, in the UK, April 25, 2011, in Europe, and April 26, 2011, in the US.

Design
Both the digipack and vinyl editions of the album case can be unfolded to form a model of a house (with either red or green walls). If viewed from the inside, the view from the door of the house is overlooking a tornado across a plain. A poster of an un-kept lawn to place the house on and a "postcard from 1952" with the track listing was included also. Early printings of the vinyl had colored vinyl and etchings of floorboards on one side.

Reception

The album mostly received positive reviews from critics, peaking at #81 on the iTunes Store. Metacritic assigned it an average score of 77 out of 100, based on 31 reviews. Gregory Heaney of AllMusic compliments the album, saying "it feels as though Explosions in the Sky have developed an even greater sense of patience, allowing songs to build up more intricately without rushing their way into a huge moment of distortion-filled catharsis." Kevin Liedel of Slant Magazine gave it a 3 out of 5, saying "In the end, the Texas band can't help but eventually indulge their desire to produce epic, guitar-driven film-score material, and after some initial feints into other territory, Take Care is business as usual."

Track listing

References

2011 albums
Explosions in the Sky albums
Temporary Residence Limited albums
Albums produced by John Congleton
Albums recorded at Sonic Ranch
Instrumental albums